Varman is a village in Sirohi District of Rajasthan state in India. It is 45 km from Abu Road. The population of Varman is 3387. Male population is 1770 and female population is 1617. Varman is known for the BrahamanSwami or  Sun Temple which follows the same traditional artistic style of Konark and Dashpur Sun Temples.

It is the oldest sun temple and from the architectural and artistic point of view it is the third in the country. The architectural beauty of the sun temple is magnificent. The exemplary stone carving work on the pillars, domes, pradkashina  shows the artistic inheritances of the Sirohi region. The delicate and sophisticated carving works on the domes and roof of the temple have equivalence to that of Delwara Jain Temple of Mount Abu.

This Sun Temple was destructed by Alauddin khilji during his Gujarat invasion   The place was famous for Sun Temple which is known as Brahmana Swami.

During the reign of Paramara ruler Vikramasimha of Chandravati the temple was rebuilt in 1299 AD by Lalitadevi, wife of Paratihara Raja Vinnada.temple has lost its past glory and now only few remains of the temple are cited at  Varman which includes damaged idols, broken pillars, remains of falling roof. Stone scripts says that this temple was attacked and destroyed by Allauddin Khilji during his Gujarat triumph.

There is a Jain temple of Bhagvan shri Mahavir and also the temple of Varmesvara (Shiva). Brahmanaka Gachchha originated from this place. Jirawala Parswanath is 5 km. and Revdar is 3 km. away from Varman.

Revdar is 7.9 km and Jirawala 14.1 km from Varman.

References
http://www.indianmap.net.in/rajasthan/sirohi/reodar/.varman

Villages in Sirohi district
Tourist attractions in Sirohi district